Oromo ( or ; ,), in the linguistic literature of the early 20th century also called Galla (a name with a pejorative meaning and therefore rejected by the Oromo people), is an Afroasiatic language that belongs to the Cushitic branch. It is native to the Ethiopian state of Oromia and Northern Kenya and is spoken predominantly by the Oromo people and neighboring ethnic groups in the Horn of Africa. It is used as a lingua franca particularly in the Oromia Region and northeastern Kenya.

With more than 36 million speakers making up 33.8% of the total Ethiopian population, Oromo has the largest number of native speakers in Ethiopia, and ranks as the second most widely spoken language in Ethiopia by total number of speakers (including second-language speakers) following Amharic. Forms of Oromo are spoken as a first language by an additional half-million people in parts of northern and eastern Kenya. It is also spoken by smaller numbers of emigrants in other African countries such as South Africa, Libya, Egypt and Sudan. Oromo is the most widely spoken Cushitic language and among the five languages of Africa with the largest mother-tongue populations. 

Oromo serves as one of the official working languages of Ethiopia and is also the working language of several of the states within the Ethiopian federal system including Oromia, Harari and Dire Dawa regional states and of the Oromia Zone in the Amhara Region. It is a language of primary education in Oromia, Harari, Dire Dawa, Benishangul-Gumuz and Addis Ababa and of the Oromia Zone in the Amhara Region. It is used as an internet language for federal websites along with Tigrinya. Under Haile Selassie's regime, Oromo was banned in education, in conversation, and in administrative matters.

Varieties 

Ethnologue (2015) assigns five ISO codes to Oromo:
Boranaa–Arsii–Gujii Oromo (Southern Oromo, including Gabra and Sakuye dialects), ISO code [gax]
Eastern Oromo (Harar), ISO code [hae]
Orma (Munyo, Orma, Waata/Sanye), ISO code [orc]
West–Central Oromo (Western Oromo and Central Oromo, including Mecha/Wollega, Raya, Wello (Kemise), Tulema/Shewa), ISO code [gaz]
Waata, ISO code [ssn]

Blench (2006) divides Oromo into four languages:
Western Oromo (Maca)
Shewa (Tuulama, Arsi)
Eastern Oromo (Harar)
Southern Oromo (Ajuran, Borana, Gabra, Munyo, Orma, Sakuye, Waata)

Some of the varieties of Oromo have been examined and classified.

Speakers 
About 85 percent of Oromo speakers live in Ethiopia, mainly in the Oromia Region. In addition, in Somalia there are also some speakers of the language. In Kenya, the Ethnologue also lists 722,000 speakers of Borana and Orma, two languages closely related to Ethiopian Oromo. Within Ethiopia, Oromo is the language with the largest number of native speakers.

Within Africa, Oromo is the language with the fourth most speakers, after Arabic (if one counts the mutually unintelligible spoken forms of Arabic as a single language and assumes the same for the varieties of Oromo), Swahili, and Hausa.

Besides first language speakers, a number of members of other ethnicities who are in contact with the Oromo speak it as a second language. See, for example, the Omotic-speaking Bambassi and the Nilo-Saharan-speaking Kwama in northwestern Oromia.

Language policy 
The Oromo people use a highly developed oral tradition. In the 19th century, scholars began writing in the Oromo language using Latin script. In 1842, Johann Ludwig Krapf began translations of the Gospels of John and Matthew into Oromo, as well as a first grammar and vocabulary. The first Oromo dictionary and grammar was produced by German scholar Karl Tutschek in 1844. The first  printing of a transliteration of Oromo language was in 1846 in a German newspaper in an article on the Oromo in Germany.

After Abyssinia annexed Oromo's territory, the language's development into a full-fledged writing instrument was interrupted. The few works that had been published, most notably Onesimos Nesib's and Aster Ganno's translations of the Bible from the late 19th century, were written in the Ge'ez alphabet. Following the 1974 Revolution, the government undertook a literacy campaign in several languages, including Oromo, and publishing and radio broadcasts began in the language. All Oromo materials printed in Ethiopia at that time, such as the newspaper ,  and many others, were written in the traditional Ethiopic script.

Plans to introduce Oromo language instruction in schools, however, were not realized until the government of Mengistu Haile Mariam was overthrown in 1991, except in regions controlled by the Oromo Liberation Front (OLF). With the creation of the regional state of Oromia under the new system of ethnic federalism in Ethiopia, it has been possible to introduce Oromo as the medium of instruction in elementary schools throughout the region, including areas where other ethnic groups live speaking their languages, and as a language of administration within the region. Since the OLF left the transitional Ethiopian government in the early 1990s, the Oromo Peoples' Democratic Organization (OPDO) continued developing Oromo in Ethiopia.

Radio broadcasts began in the Oromo language in Somalia in 1960 by Radio Mogadishu. The programme featured music and propaganda. A song  (Liberation is Milk) became a hit in Ethiopia. To combat Somali wide-reaching influence, the Ethiopian Government initiated an Oromo language program radio of their own. Within Kenya there has been radio broadcasting in Oromo (in the Borana dialect) on the Voice of Kenya since at least the 1980s. The Borana Bible in Kenya was printed in 1995 using the Latin alphabet, but not using the same spelling rules as in Ethiopian Qubee. The first comprehensive online Oromo dictionary was developed by the Jimma Times Oromiffa Group (JTOG) in cooperation with SelamSoft. Voice of America also broadcasts in Oromo alongside its other horn of Africa programs. Oromo and Qubee are currently utilized by the Ethiopian government's state radios, TV stations and regional government newspaper.

Phonology and orthography

Writing systems 

Oromo is written with a Latin alphabet called  which was formally adopted in 1991. Various versions of the Latin-based orthography had been used previously, mostly by Oromos outside of Ethiopia and by the OLF by the late 1970s (Heine 1986). With the adoption of Qubee, it is believed more texts were written in the Oromo language between 1991 and 1997 than in the previous 100 years. In Kenya, the Borana and Waata also use Roman letters but with different systems.

The Sapalo script was an indigenous Oromo script invented by Sheikh Bakri Sapalo (1895–1980; also known by his birth name, Abubaker Usman Odaa) in the late 1950s, and used underground afterwards. Despite structural and organizational influences from Ge'ez and the Arabic script, it is a graphically independent creation designed specifically for Oromo phonology. It is largely alphasyllabic in nature, but lacks the inherent vowel present in many such systems; in actual use, all consonant characters are obligatorially marked either with vowel signs (producing CV syllables) or with separate marks used to denote long consonants and consonants not followed by a vowel (e.g. in word-final environments or as part of consonant clusters).

The Arabic script has also been used intermittently in areas with Muslim populations.

Consonant and vowel phonemes 
Like most other Ethiopian languages, whether Semitic, Cushitic, or Omotic, Oromo has a set of ejective consonants, that is, voiceless stops or affricates that are accompanied by glottalization and an explosive burst of air. Oromo has another glottalized phone that is more unusual, an implosive retroflex stop, "dh" in Oromo orthography, a sound that is like an English "d" produced with the tongue curled back slightly and with the air drawn in so that a glottal stop is heard before the following vowel begins. It is retroflex in most dialects, though it is not strongly implosive and may reduce to a flap between vowels. One source describes it as voiceless .

Oromo has the typical Eastern Cushitic set of five short and five long vowels, indicated in the orthography by doubling the five vowel letters. The difference in length is contrastive, for example,  'lake',  'new'. Gemination is also significant in Oromo. That is, consonant length can distinguish words from one another, for example,  'bad',  'highland'.

In the Qubee alphabet, letters include the digraphs ch, dh, ny, ph, sh. Gemination is not obligatorily marked for digraphs, though some writers indicate it by doubling the first element:  'be prepared'. In the charts below, the International Phonetic Alphabet symbol for a phoneme is shown in brackets where it differs from the Oromo letter. The phonemes  appear in parentheses because they are only found in recently adopted words.

Tone and stress 
Only the penultimate or final syllable of a root can have a high tone, and if the penultimate is high, the final must also be high; this implies that Oromo has a pitch-accent system (in which the tone need be specified only on one syllable, the others being predictable) rather than a tone system (in which each syllable must have its tone specified), although the rules are complex (each morpheme can contribute its own tone pattern to the word), so that "one can call Oromo a pitch-accent system in terms of the basic lexical representation of pitch, and a tone system in terms of its surface realization." The stressed syllable is perceived as the first syllable of a word with high pitch.

Grammar

Nouns

Gender 
Like most other Afroasiatic languages, Oromo has two grammatical genders,
masculine and feminine, and all nouns belong to either one or the other.
Grammatical gender in Oromo enters into the grammar in the following ways:
Verbs (except for the copula be) agree with their subjects in gender when the subject is third person singular (he or she).
Third person singular personal pronouns (he, she, it, etc., in English) have the gender of the noun they refer to.
Adjectives agree with the nouns they modify in gender.
Some possessive adjectives ("my", "your") agree with the nouns they modify in some dialects.

Except in some southern dialects, there is nothing in the form of most nouns that indicates their gender. Grammatical gender normally agrees with natural gender for people and animals; thus nouns such as  'father',  'son', and  'ox' are masculine, while nouns such as  'mother' and  'girl, daughter' are feminine. However, most names for animals do not specify biological gender.

Names of astronomical bodies are feminine:  'sun',  'star'. The gender of other inanimate nouns varies somewhat among dialects.

Number 
Oromo displays singular and plural number, but nouns that refer to multiple entities are not obligatorily plural:  'man'  'people',  'five men'  'five people'. Another way of looking at this is to treat the "singular" form as unspecified for number.

When it is important to make the plurality of a referent clear, the plural form of a noun is used. Noun plurals are formed through the addition of suffixes.

Definiteness 
Vowel endings of nouns are dropped before these suffixes:  'road',  'the road',  'man', / 'the man',  'lake',  'the lake'. Note that for animate nouns that can take either gender, the definite suffix may indicate the intended gender:  'priest',  'the priest (m.)',  'the priest (f.)'. The definite suffixes appear to be used less often than the in English, and they seem not to co-occur with the plural suffixes.

Case 
Oromo nouns appear in seven grammatical cases, each indicated by a suffix, the lengthening of the noun's final vowel, or both. For some of the cases, there is a range of forms possible, some covering more than one case, and the differences in meaning among these alternatives may be quite subtle.

 Absolutive
The absolutive case is the citation form or base form that is used when the noun is the object of a verb, the object of a preposition or postposition, or a nominal predicative.
  'house',  'we bought a house'
  'until',  'end',  'until (the) end'
 , 'inside (a/the) house'
  'he',  'teacher' 
  'he is a teacher'
 Nominative
 The nominative is used for nouns that are the subjects of clauses.
  (a name),  'Ibsaa (nom.)',  '(a) car',  'he has':
  'Ibsaa has a car'.
 Most nouns ending in short vowels with a preceding single consonant drop the final vowel and add  to form the nominative.
 'man',  'man (nom.)'
 If a final short vowel is preceded by two consonants or a geminated consonant,  is suffixed.
  'statement',  'statement (nom.)'
 If the noun ends in a long vowel,  is suffixed to this.
 'name',  'name (nom.)'
  'to eat, eating',  'to eat, eating (nom.)'
  'mouth, language (base form or nom.)'
 Some feminine nouns ending in a short vowel add . Again assimilation occurs in some cases.
 'mother',  ( +  assimilates to )
  'earth', 
 Genitive
The genitive is usually formed by lengthening a final short vowel, by adding  to a final consonant, and by leaving a final long vowel unchanged. The possessor noun follows the possessed noun in a genitive phrase. Many such phrases with specific technical meanings have been added to the Oromo lexicon in recent years.
 'sister',  'the man',  'the man's sister'
  'job', woman's name, 'Caaltuu's job'
  'field of study',  'mouth, language',  'linguistics'
 In place of the genitive it is also possible to use the relative marker  (m.) /  (f.) preceding the possessor.
  'the man's sister'
 Dative
 The dative is used for nouns that represent the recipient (to) or the benefactor (for) of an event. The dative form of a verb infinitive (which acts like a noun in Oromo) indicates purpose. The dative takes one of the following forms:
 Lengthening of a final short vowel (ambiguously also signifying the genitive)
 'the man',  'to the man, of the man'
 following a long vowel or a lengthened short vowel;  following a consonant
 'girl, daughter',  'to a girl, daughter'
  'dog',  'to a dog'
  'to learn',  'in order to learn'
  'water',  'for water'
 or  following a long vowel
 'dog';  'to a dog'
 (with no change to a preceding vowel), especially with verbs of speaking
 woman's name,  'tell, say (imperative)',  'tell Caaltuu'
 Instrumental
 The instrumental is used for nouns that represent the instrument ("with"), the means ("by"), the agent ("by"), the reason, or the time of an event. The formation of the instrumental parallels that of the dative to some extent:
 following a long vowel or a lengthened short vowel;  following a consonant
 'hand',  'by hand, with a hand'
  'night',  'at night'
 following a long vowel or a lengthened short vowel
 'Oromo (language)',  'in Oromo'
 following a long vowel
 'time',  'on time'
  'to come out, coming out',  'by coming out'
 Locative
 The locative is used for nouns that represent general locations of events or states, roughly at. For more specific locations, Oromo uses prepositions or postpositions. Postpositions may also take the locative suffix. The locative also seems to overlap somewhat with the instrumental, sometimes having a temporal function. The locative is formed with the suffix .
 'in Arsii'
  'hand',  'in hand'
  'day',  'per day'
  'under'
 Ablative
 The ablative is used to represent the source of an event; it corresponds closely to English from. The ablative, applied to postpositions and locative adverbs as well as nouns proper, is formed in the following ways:
 When the word ends in a short vowel, this vowel is lengthened (as for the genitive).
 'country',  'from country'
  'inside, in',  'from inside'
 When the word ends in a long vowel,  is added (as for one alternative for the dative).
 'from Finfinne'
  'market',  'from market'
 When the word ends in a consonant,  is added (as for the genitive).
 'from Harar'
 Following a noun in the genitive,  is added.
 'house',  'coffee',  'cafe',  'from cafe'
 An alternative to the ablative is the postposition  'from' whose initial vowel may be dropped in the process:
  'market',  'from market'

Pronouns

Personal pronouns 
In most languages, there is a small number of basic distinctions of person, number, and often gender that play a role within the grammar of the language. Oromo and English are such languages. We see these distinctions within the basic set of independent personal pronouns, for example, English I, Oromo ; English they, Oromo '' and the set of possessive adjectives and pronouns, for example, English my, Oromo ; English mine, Oromo . In Oromo, the same distinctions are also reflected in subject–verb agreement: Oromo verbs (with a few exceptions) agree with their subjects; that is, the person, number, and (singular third person) gender of the subject of the verb are marked by suffixes on the verb. Because these suffixes vary greatly with the particular verb tense/aspect/mood, they are normally not considered to be pronouns and are discussed elsewhere in this article under verb conjugation.

In all of these areas of the grammar—independent pronouns, possessive adjectives, possessive pronouns, and subject–verb agreement—Oromo distinguishes seven combinations of person, number, and gender. For first and second persons, there is a two-way distinction between singular ('I', 'you sg.') and plural ('we', 'you pl.'), whereas for third person, there is a two-way distinction in the singular ('he', 'she') and a single form for the plural ('they'). Because Oromo has only two genders, there is no pronoun corresponding to English it; the masculine or feminine pronoun is used according to the gender of the noun referred to.

Oromo is a subject pro-drop language. That is, neutral sentences in which the subject is not emphasized do not require independent subject pronouns:  'we came yesterday'.
The Oromo word that translates 'we' does not appear in this sentence, though the person and number are marked on the verb  ('we came') by the suffix . When the subject in such sentences needs to be given prominence for some reason, an independent pronoun can be used: '' 'we came yesterday'.

The table below gives forms of the personal pronouns in the different cases, as well as the possessive adjectives. For the first person plural and third person singular feminine categories, there is considerable variation across dialects; only some of the possibilities are shown.

The possessive adjectives, treated as separate words here, are sometimes written as noun suffixes. In most dialects there is a distinction between masculine and feminine possessive adjectives for first and second person (the form agreeing with the gender of the modified noun). However, in the western dialects, the masculine forms (those beginning with ) are used in all cases. Possessive adjectives may take the case endings for the nouns they modify:  'to my village' (: locative case).

As in languages such as French, Russian, and Turkish, the Oromo second person plural is also used as a polite singular form, for reference to people that the speaker wishes to show respect towards. This usage is an example of the so-called T-V distinction that is made in many languages. In addition, the third person plural may be used for polite reference to a single third person (either 'he' or 'she').

For possessive pronouns ('mine', 'yours', etc.), Oromo adds the possessive adjectives to  'of':  'mine',  'yours', etc.

Reflexive and reciprocal pronouns 
Oromo has two ways of expressing reflexive pronouns ('myself', 'yourself', etc.). This noun is inflected for case but, unless it is being emphasized, not for person, number, or gender:  'she looks at herself' (base form of ),  'she bought herself a car' (dative of ).

The other possibility is to use the noun meaning 'head', with possessive suffixes:  'myself',  'yourself (s.)', etc.

Oromo has a reciprocal pronoun  (English 'each other') that is used like . That is, it is inflected for case but not person, number, or gender:  'they like each other' (base form of ),  'they bought each other gifts' (dative of ).

Demonstrative pronouns 
Like English, Oromo makes a two-way distinction between proximal ('this, these') and distal ('that, those') demonstrative pronouns and adjectives. Some dialects distinguish masculine and feminine for the proximal pronouns; in the western dialects the masculine forms (beginning with ) are used for both genders. Unlike in English, singular and plural demonstratives are not distinguished, but, as for nouns and personal pronouns in the language, case is distinguished. Only the base and nominative forms are shown in the table below; the other cases are formed from the base form as for nouns, for example,  'at/on/in that' (locative case).

Verbs 
An Oromo verb consists minimally of a stem, representing the lexical meaning of the verb, and a suffix, representing tense or aspect and subject agreement. For example, in  'we came',  is the stem ('come') and  indicates that the tense is past and that the subject of the verb is first person plural.

As in many other Afroasiatic languages, Oromo makes a basic two-way distinction in its verb system between the two tensed forms, past (or "perfect") and present (or "imperfect" or "non-past"). Each of these has its own set of tense/agreement suffixes. There is a third conjugation based on the present which has three functions: it is used in place of the present in subordinate clauses, for the jussive ('let me/us/him, etc. V', together with the particle ), and for the negative of the present (together with the particle ). For example,  'we went',  'we go',  'that we go',  'let's go',  'we don't go'. There is also a separate imperative form:  'go (sg.)!'. Conjugation 
The table below shows the conjugation in the affirmative and negative of the verb  'know'. The first person singular present and past affirmative forms require the suffix  to appear on the word preceding the verb or the word  before the verb. The negative particle , shown as a separate word in the table, is sometimes written as a prefix on the verb.

For verbs with stems ending in certain consonants and suffixes beginning with consonants (that is,  or ), there are predictable changes to one or the other of the consonants. The dialects vary a lot in the details, but the following changes are common.

Verbs whose stems end in two consonants and whose suffix begins with a consonant must insert a vowel to break up the consonants since the language does not permit sequences of three consonants. There are two ways this can happen: either the vowel i is inserted between the stem and the suffix, or the final stem consonants are switched (an example of metathesis) and the vowel a is inserted between them.

Verbs whose stems end in the consonant ' (which may appear as h, w, or y in some words, depending on the dialect) belong to three different conjugation classes; the class is not predictable from the verb stem. It is the forms that precede suffixes beginning with consonants (t and n) that differ from the usual pattern. The third person masculine singular, second person singular, and first person plural present forms are shown for an example verb in each class.
 '- 'die': ' 'he dies',  'you (sg.) die',  'we die'
 '-, 'be hungry': ' 'he is hungry',  'you (sg.) are hungry',  'we are hungry'
 '- 'hear': ' 'he hears',  'you (sg.) hear',  'we hear' (note that the suffix consonants change)

The common verbs  'want' and  'do' deviate from the basic conjugation pattern in that long vowels replace the geminated consonants that would result when suffixes beginning with t or n are added:  'he wants',  'you (sg.) want',  'we want',  'you (pl.) want',  'didn't want', etc.

The verb  'come' has the irregular imperatives , . The verb  'go' has, alongside regular imperative forms, the irregular imperatives , .

 Derivation 
An Oromo verb root can be the basis for three derived voices, passive, causative, and autobenefactive, each formed with addition of a suffix to the root, yielding the stem that the inflectional suffixes are added to.
 Passive voice
 The Oromo passive corresponds closely to the English passive in function. It is formed by adding -am to the verb root. The resulting stem is conjugated regularly. Examples:  'know',  'be known',  'they were known';  'say',  'be said',  'it is said'
 Causative voice
 The Oromo causative of a verb V corresponds to English expressions such as 'cause V', 'make V', 'let V'. With intransitive verbs, it has a transitivizing function. It is formed by adding -s, -sis, or -siis to the verb root, except that roots ending in -l add -ch. Verbs whose roots end in ' drop this consonant and may lengthen the preceding vowel before adding -s. Examples:  'know',  'cause to know, inform',  'we informed'; '- 'go up, get up',  'pick up',  'pick up (sing.)!';  'enter',  'put in',  'she puts in';  'learn',  'teach',  'I teach'.
 Autobenefactive voice
 The Oromo autobenefactive (or "middle" or "reflexive-middle") voice of a verb V corresponds roughly to English expressions such as 'V for oneself' or 'V on one's own', though the precise meaning may be somewhat unpredictable for many verbs. It is formed by adding -adh to the verb root. The conjugation of a middle verb is irregular in the third person singular masculine of the present and past (-dh in the stem changes to -t) and in the singular imperative (the suffix is -u rather than -i). Examples:  'buy',  'buy for oneself',  'he bought (something) for himself',  'buy for yourself (sing.)!';  'have',  'seize, hold (for oneself)',  'we hold'. Some autobenefactives are derived from nouns rather than verbs, for example,  'work' from the noun  'work'.

The voice suffixes can be combined in various ways. Two causative suffixes are possible: '- 'go up',  'pick up',  'cause to pick up'. The causative may be followed by the passive or the autobenefactive; in this case the s of the causative is replaced by f: '- 'return (intransitive)',  'return (transitive), answer',  'be returned, be answered',  'get back for oneself'.

Another derived verbal aspect is the frequentative or "intensive," formed by copying the first consonant and vowel of the verb root and geminating the second occurrence of the initial consonant. The resulting stem indicates the repetition or intensive performance of the action of the verb. Examples:  'spend the night',  'spend several nights',  'break',  'break to pieces, break completely';  'push, apply pressure',  'massage'.

The infinitive is formed from a verb stem with the addition of the suffix -uu. Verbs whose stems end in -dh (in particular all autobenefactive verbs) change this to ch before the suffix. Examples:  'drink',  'to drink'; '- 'reach', ' 'to reach';  'say',  'to say'. The verb  is exceptional; its infinitive is  rather than the expected . The infinitive behaves like a noun; that is, it can take any of the case suffixes. Examples: ' 'to reach', ' 'in order to reach' (dative case);  'drink',  'be drunk',  to be drunk',  'by being drunk' (instrumental case).

 References

 Bibliography 

 Grammar 

 
 
 
 
 
 
 
 
 

 Dictionaries 

 
 
Gragg, Gene B. et al. (ed., 1982) Oromo Dictionary''. Monograph (Michigan State University. Committee on Northeast African Studies) no. 12. East Lansing, Mich. : African Studies Center, Michigan State Univ.

External links 

 BBC Learning English Afaan Oromoo
 Oromo language learning

Online Oromo – Qubee Dictionary
Voice of America news broadcast in Oromo.
Oromo Federalist Democratic Movement (OFDM) website contains many articles written in Oromo and audio.
PanAfriL10n page on Oromo
HornMorpho : software for morphological analysis and generation of Oromo (and Amharic and Tigrinya) words
500 Word Oromo Dictionary
Oromo – Daily News

 
East Cushitic languages
Languages of Ethiopia
Languages of Kenya